Aris is a village and a former municipality in Messenia, Peloponnese, Greece. Since the 2011 local government reform it is part of the municipality Kalamata, of which it is a municipal unit. The municipal unit has an area of 22.497 km2. Population 2,071 (2011).

References

Populated places in Messenia